Apex Manor is an American indie rock band, formed in Pasadena, California in 2010.

Ross Flournoy of The Broken West wrote the band's first songs during an online songwriting contest at NPR. Their debut LP, The Year of Magical Drinking, was released on January 25, 2011 on Merge records.

Discography
 2011: The Year of Magical Drinking
 2019: Heartbreak City

References

External links 
 Apex Manor at Merge Records
 Apex Manor on Myspace
 Apex Manor at Rolling Stone

Indie rock musical groups from California
Merge Records artists